Rosalind "Ros" Canter (born 13 January 1986) is a British equestrian who competes in eventing. She is the 2018 World Champion.

Early life
Canter grew up on the family farm in Hallington, Lincolnshire. She has a degree in sports science from Sheffield Hallam University.

Career
Canter's CCI ****  results include finishing fifth at the 2017 Badminton Horse Trials on Allstar B, and ninth at the 2017 Luhmühlen Horse Trials on Zenshera. She then won team gold and finished fifth individually at the 2017 European Eventing Championships on Allstar B, before finishing seventh at the 2017 Stars of Pau on Zenshera. In May 2018, she finished third at the Badminton Horse Trials on Allstar B.

Canter won two golds at the 2018 FEI World Equestrian Games in Tryon, riding Allstar B. She is the fifth British rider to become World Champion in Eventing, after Mary Gordon-Watson (1970), Lucinda Green (1982), Virginia Leng (1986), and Zara Phillips (2006).

In 2022 she competed with Lordships Graffalo in the World Eventing Championships in Pratoni del Vivaro as a member of the British Team, where they finished 4th individually and as a team.

CCI5* Results

International Championship Results

References

1986 births
Living people
British event riders
Alumni of Sheffield Hallam University
People from East Lindsey District